Duogiai (formerly) is a village in Kėdainiai district municipality, in Kaunas County, in central Lithuania. According to the 2011 census, the village was uninhabited.

It was an okolica (a property of the Kelčiavos, Koricos, Leščiučiai, Losinskiai, Sutkevičiai families) at the beginning of the 20th century.

Demography

References

Villages in Kaunas County
Kėdainiai District Municipality